Rosena may refer to:
Rosena Allin-Khan (born 1976 or 1977), English medical doctor, Labour Member of Parliament (MP) for Tooting since June 2016
Rosena Brown (born ), Irish actress from Belfast, and intelligence officer for the Provisional IRA
 Rosena, Virginia, unincorporated community in Albemarle County, Virginia, United States
Rosena, California the original name of the city of Fontana, California

Disambiguation pages with given-name-holder lists
English-language surnames